DS Smith plc is a British multinational packaging business, headquartered in London, England. It is listed on the London Stock Exchange and is a constituent of the FTSE 100 Index.

History
The business was founded by two cousins, David Gabriel Smith and David Solomon Smith in 1940, to manufacture cartons. It was first listed on the London Stock Exchange in the late 1950s.

In 1986 the company acquired St Regis Paper Company and in 1988 Kemsley Paper Mill, both paper manufacturing businesses. In 1991 the business bought Kaysersberg Packaging, a leading packaging business, and in 1993 it bought Spicers, an office products wholesaler. In 1996 it acquired John Dickinson, an envelope manufacturer, and in 2004 it completed the purchase of Linpac Containers, a corrugated packaging manufacturer.

The company sold Spicers, its office products wholesaling business, for £200 million, in July 2011 and acquired the packaging division of Svenska Cellulosa Aktiebolaget ('SCA') for a net consideration of approximately €1.6 billion (c. £1.3 billion) in July 2012. It went on to complete the acquisition of Duropack for approximately €300m (c. £220m) in May 2015 and became a constituent of the FTSE 100 Index in December 2017.

Operations

DS Smith is a leading provider of sustainable fibre-based packaging in Europe and the United States, with recycling and papermaking operations. The company manufactures packaging that is 100% recyclable, and has sites in 37 countries.

References

External links

Manufacturing companies established in 1940
Pulp and paper companies of the United Kingdom
Companies listed on the London Stock Exchange
1940 establishments in England
Packaging companies
Companies established in 1940
1940 establishments in the United Kingdom